Lauvnesvatnet is a fishing lake in the municipalities of Sigdal and Flesberg in Viken county, Norway. It is located at an elevation of 366 meters above sea level. It forms part of the Drammensvassdraget watershed.

See also
List of lakes in Norway

References

Lakes of Viken (county)